The 2003–04 Elite Ice Hockey League season was the inaugural season of the Elite League. The season ran from September 12, 2003 until April 4, 2004.

During the 2002–03 season, the financial collapse of the Manchester Storm and the Scottish Eagles, the resignation of the Bracknell Bees and the uncertainty surrounding the London Knights and their London Arena home left the Ice Hockey Superleague with little option but to fold.

The three remaining Superleague clubs, the Belfast Giants, Nottingham Panthers and Sheffield Steelers were joined by three British National League clubs, the Basingstoke Bison, Cardiff Devils and Coventry Blaze and two new clubs, the London Racers and Manchester Phoenix in establishing the Elite Ice Hockey League. The clubs hoped to provide a more financially sustainable league than its predecessor with a greater number of British trained players taking part.

The league was met with considerable opposition from the governing body, Ice Hockey UK who initially refused to affiliate itself with the new league, instead desiring that the remaining Superleague clubs integrate themselves into the British National League. This led to a bitter summer of uncertainty which only the intervention of the International Ice Hockey Federation ended. The IIHF ruled that the Elite League be granted a single season's affiliation with IHUK while discussions between IHUK, the EIHL and the BNL took place on the future of the sport in the United Kingdom.

The season began on September 12, 2003 with a game between the newly formed London Racers and the previous season's league champions, Sheffield Steelers. London began the season at Alexandra Palace but within a few weeks had relocated to the Lee Valley Ice Centre. The Racers went much of the season without winning, before finally claiming a 3–0 victory over Cardiff as the season drew to its close.

Challenge Cup
During the early part of the season, the results from league games also counted towards a separate Challenge Cup table. After each team had played each other once at home and once away, the top four teams in the table qualified for the semi finals.

Semi-finals

1st (Belfast) vs 4th (Nottingham)
Belfast Giants 2–4 Nottingham Panthers
Nottingham Panthers 7–3 Belfast Giants (Nottingham win 11–5 on aggregate)

2nd (Sheffield) vs 3rd (Cardiff)
Cardiff Devils 1–3 Sheffield Steelers
Sheffield Steelers 1–1 Cardiff Devils (Sheffield win 4–2 on aggregate)

Final

The final brought Nottingham and Sheffield head-to-head in a major final for the seventh time. The Steelers had won each of the last six finals in a run stretching back to 1995 and were clear favourites to win a seventh straight final against their bitter rivals after convincingly winning the Elite League title.

After a tight 1–1 draw at the National Ice Centre, the two clubs met in the second leg at Sheffield Arena on March 17. The Panthers stormed into an early 2–0 lead before the Steelers fought back to tie the game at 2–2. Regulation time ended level and so the game went into overtime. After 53 seconds, Kim Ahlroos won the game for Nottingham, ending an eight-year wait for the club to defeat their rivals in a showpiece event.

First Leg
Nottingham Panthers 1–1 Sheffield Steelers

Second Leg
Sheffield Steelers 2–3 Nottingham Panthers (after overtime, Nottingham win 4–3 on aggregate)

Elite League Table

Each team played four home games and four away games against each of their opponents. Sheffield and Nottingham fought it out for the inaugural Elite League title before the Steelers pulled away to become comfortable champions, thanks to twenty consecutive wins, including 7–3, 5–0, 3–0 and 7–4 victories over the Panthers.

Nottingham finished runner-up while Coventry were the most successful former BNL side, finishing third. Belfast began the season strongly before a poor run of results in the second half of the season saw them slip to fourth place. Struggling London were always destined to finish last, doing so by thirty-eight points, while Basingstoke also missed out on a place in the playoffs.

Elite League Play Offs

The top six teams qualified for the playoffs. Group A consisted of Sheffield, Belfast and Manchester while Group B consisted of Nottingham, Coventry and Cardiff. The Phoenix chose to stage one of its home games, against the Steelers at the 1,500 capacity IceSheffield rather than play the substantial costs involved in hiring the MEN Arena.

Group A

Group B

Semi-finals

The finals weekend took place over the weekend of 3 April-4 April at the National Ice Centre in Nottingham.

Winner A vs Runner-Up B
Sheffield Steelers 2–0 Cardiff Devils

Winner B vs Runner-Up A
Nottingham Panthers 6–1 Manchester Phoenix

Final

Winner A vs Winner B
Sheffield Steelers 2–1 Nottingham Panthers

The final saw the two main protagonists of the season come head-to-head in a repeat of the title race and Challenge Cup final. The Steelers avenged their overtime loss in the Cup a few weeks earlier by beating the Panthers 2–1 before a capacity crowd at the NIC. Sheffield marched into a 2–0 lead before Nottingham pulled a goal back on a 5 on 3 powerplay. The Panthers never seriously threatened Sheffield's goal and in the end the Steelers were comfortable winners.

Awards
Coach of the Year Trophy – Mike Blaisdell, Sheffield Steelers
Player of the Year Trophy – Jason Ruff, Belfast Giants
Alan Weeks Trophy – Leigh Jamieson, Belfast Giants
Best British Forward – Ashley Tait, Coventry Blaze
Vic Batchelder Memorial Award – Leigh Jamieson, Belfast Giants

All Star teams

Scoring leaders
The scoring leaders are taken from all league games.

Most points: 88 Mark Dutiaume, Sheffield Steelers
Most goals: 39 John Craighead, Nottingham Panthers
Most assists: 54 Mark Dutiaume, Sheffield Steelers
Most PIMs: 352 Paxton Schulte, Belfast Giants

References
Ice Hockey Journalists UK
The Internet Hockey Database
Malcolm Preen's Ice Hockey Results and Tables

Elite Ice Hockey League seasons
1
United